In mathematics, the generalized polygamma function or balanced negapolygamma function is a function introduced by Olivier Espinosa Aldunate and Victor Hugo Moll.

It generalizes the polygamma function to negative and fractional order, but remains equal to it for integer positive orders.

Definition

The generalized polygamma function is defined as follows:

 
    
or alternatively,

 

The function is balanced, in that it satisfies the conditions
.

Relations

Several special functions can be expressed in terms of generalized polygamma function.

where  are the Bernoulli polynomials

Special values

References

Gamma and related functions